Irene Vecchi (10 June 1989, Livorno) is an Italian sabre fencer. She earned a bronze medal in the 2013 World Championships and 2017 World Championships, an individual bronze at the 2013 European Championships and won the team gold medal at the 2011 European Fencing Championships.  

She has twice competed for Italy at the Olympics, in the women's sabre individual in 2012 and 2016 and in the women's team sabre in 2016.  She competed at the 2020 Summer Olympics, in Sabre

Life 
Vecchi has a degree in political science from the University of Pisa, and works as a police officer.  She began to fence at the age of eight; her mother worked at a fencing hall and enrolled her.

References

Italian female sabre fencers
Living people
Fencers at the 2012 Summer Olympics
Fencers at the 2016 Summer Olympics
Olympic fencers of Italy
Sportspeople from Livorno
1989 births
University of Pisa alumni
European Championships (multi-sport event) bronze medalists
European Championships (multi-sport event) gold medalists
World Fencing Championships medalists
Fencers at the 2020 Summer Olympics
20th-century Italian women
21st-century Italian women